Yumbera is a genus of flies in the family Dolichopodidae, known from eastern mainland Australia and Tasmania. The generic name is an Australian aboriginal word meaning "fly".

Species
 Yumbera athertonia Bickel, 1992
 Yumbera callida (Parent, 1932)
 Yumbera conica Bickel, 1992
 Yumbera nudicornis Bickel, 1992
 Yumbera signata Bickel, 1992
 Yumbera trisignata Bickel, 2012

References

Dolichopodidae genera
Sympycninae
Diptera of Australasia